This is a list of institutions of higher education in South Korea.

Quick index



A
Agricultural Cooperative College – Goyang, Gyeonggi
Ajou Motor College – Boryeong, South Chungcheong
Ajou University – Suwon, Gyeonggi
Andong Institute of Information Technology – Andong, North Gyeongsang
Andong National University – Andong, North Gyeongsang
Andong Science College – Andong, North Gyeongsang
Ansan University – Ansan, Gyeonggi
Ansung Polytechnic College – Anseong, Gyeonggi
Anyang University – Anyang, Gyeonggi
Asan Information and Technology Polytechnic College – Asan, South Chungcheong
Asia LIFE University – Daejeon
Asia United Theological University – Seoul and Yangpyeong County

B
See also under P

Baekseok Arts University – Seoul
Baekseok Culture University – Cheonan, 
Baekseok University - Cheonan, South Chungcheong
Baewha Women's University – Seoul
Berea University of Graduate Studies – Seoul
Bucheon University – Bucheon, Gyeonggi
Busan Arts College – Busan
Busan College of Information Technology – Busan
Busan Institute of Science and Technology  – Busan
Busan Jangsin University – see Busan Presbyterian University
Busan Kyungsang College – Busan
Busan National University of Education – Busan
Busan Polytechnic College – Busan
Busan Presbyterian University – Gimhae, South Gyeongsang
Byuksung College – Gimje, North Jeolla

C
See also under J

Calvin University – Yongin, Gyeonggi
Capital Baptist Theological Seminary – Anseong, Gyeonggi
Catholic Sangji College – Andong, North Gyeongsang
Catholic University of Daegu – Gyeongsan, North Gyeongsang
Catholic University of Korea – Seoul and Bucheon City, Gyeonggi
Catholic University of Pusan – Busan
Catholic Kwandong University - Gangneung, Gangwon-do
Cha University - Gyeonggi-do, South Korea
Changshin University – Masan, South Gyeongsang
Changwon National University – Changwon, South Gyeongsang
Changwon Polytechnic College – Changwon, South Gyeongsang
Cheju Halla University – Jeju City, Jeju
Cheju National University of Education – see Jeju National University of Education
Cheju Tourism College – Bukjeju County, Jeju
Cheonan College of Foreign Studies – see Baekseok College
Chonbuk National University – Jeonju, North Jeolla
Cheonan National Technical College – Cheonan, South Chungcheong
Cheonan University – Cheonan, South Chungcheong
Cheonan Yonam College – Cheonan, South Chungcheong
Cheongju National University of Education – Cheongju, North Chungcheong
Cheongju Polytechnic College – Cheongju, North Chungcheong
Cheongju University – Cheongju, North Chungcheong
Cheongshim Graduate School of Theology – Gapyeong-gun, Gyeonggi-do
Chinju National University of Education – Jinju, South Gyeongsang
Chodang University – Muan County, South Jeolla
Chonbuk National University – see Jeonbuk National University
Chongin College – see Jeonbuk Science College
Chongju National College of Science and Technology – Cheongju and Jeungpyeong County, North Chungcheong
Chongju University – see Cheongju University
Chongshin University – Seoul
Chonnam National University – Gwangju
Choonhae College – Ulsan
Chosun University – Gwangju
Christian College of Nursing – Gwangju
Chugye University for the Arts – Seoul
Chuncheon Polytechnic College – Chuncheon, Gangwon
Chuncheon National University of Education – Chuncheon, Gangwon
Chung Cheong University – Cheongju, North Chungcheong
Chung-Ang University – Seoul and Anseong City, Gyeonggi
Chungbuk National University – Cheongju, North Chungcheong
Chungbuk Provincial College – Okcheon County, North Chungcheong
Chungju National University – Chungju, North Chungcheong
Chungkang College of Cultural Industries – Icheon, Gyeonggi
Chungnam Provincial College – South Chungcheong
Chungnam National University – Daejeon
Chungwoon University – Hongseong County, South Chungcheong
Chunnam Techno University – Gokseong County, South Jeolla

D
See also under T

Daebul University – Yeongam County, South Jeolla
Daecheon College – see Ajou Motor College
Daedong College – Busan
Daeduk College – Daejeon
Daegu Arts University – Chilgok County, North Gyeongsang
Daegu Cyber University – Gyeongsan, North Gyeongsang
Daegu Haany University – Gyeongsan, North Gyeongsang and Daegu
Daegu Health College – Daegu
Daegu Gyeongbuk Institute of Science and Technology – Daegu
Daegu Mirae College – Gyeongsan, North Gyeongsang
Daegu National University of Education – Daegu
Daegu Polytechnic College – Daegu
Daegu Technical University – Daegu
Daegu University – Gyeongsan, North Gyeongsang
Daegu University of Foreign Studies – Gyeongsan, North Gyeongsang
Daehan Graduate School of Theology – Anyang, Gyeonggi
Daejin University – Pocheon, Gyeonggi
Daejeon Health Sciences College – Daejeon
Daejeon Polytechnic College – Daejeon
Daejeon University – Daejeon Shini Kunku
Daelim College – Anyang, Gyeonggi
Daewon Science College – Jecheon, North Chungcheong
Dankook University – Seoul and Cheonan City, South Chungcheong
Dong-A College – Yeongam County, South Jeolla
Dong-A University – Busan
Dong-Ah Broadcasting College – Anseong, Gyeonggi
Donga College of Health
Dongduk Women's University – Seoul
Dong-eui University – Busan
Dongguk University – Seoul and Gyeongju City, North Gyeongsang
Dongju College – Busan
Dongkang College – Gwangju
Dongnam Health College – Suwon, Gyeonggi
Dong-Pusan College – Busan
Dongseo University – Busan
Dong Seoul College – Seongnam, Gyeonggi
Dongshin University – Naju, South Jeolla
Dong-U College – Sokcho, Gangwon
Dongyang Mirae University – Seoul
Dongwon Institute of Science and Technology
Doowon Technical College – Anseong, Gyeonggi
Duksung Women's University – Seoul

E
Eulji University – Daejeon
Ewha Womans University – Seoul

F
Far East University – Eumseong County, North Chungcheong

G
See also under K

Gachon Medical School – Incheon
Gachongil College – Incheon
Gachon University – Seongnam, Gyeonggi
Gangdong College – Eumseong, North Chungcheong
Gangneung-Wonju National University – Gangneung, Gangwon
Gangneung Yeongdong College – Gangneung, Gangwon
Gangwon Provincial College – Gangneung, Gangwon
Geochang Polytechnic College – Geochang, South Gyeongsang
George Mason University – Songdo, Incheon
Geumgang University – Nonsan
Ghent University – Songdo, Incheon
Gimcheon Science College – see Kimcheon Science College
Gochang Polytechnic College – Gochang County, North Jeolla
Gongju National University of Education – Gongju, South Chungcheong
Graduate School of Interpretation and Translation (GSIT) – see Hankuk University of Foreign Studies
Graduate School of Korean Studies – Seongnam, Gyeonggi
Gukje Digital University – Suwon, Gyeonggi
Gumi University – Gumi, North Gyeongsang
Gumi Polytechnic College – Gumi, North Gyeongsang
Gwangju Catholic University – Gwangju
Gwangju Health University – Gwangju
Gwangju Institute of Science and Technology (GIST) – Gwangju
Gwangju National University of Education – Gwangju
Gwangju Polytechnic College – Gwangju
Gwangju University – Gwangju
Gyeongbuk Provincial College - North Gyeongsang
Gyeongin National University of Education – Incheon
Gyeongju University – Gyeongju, North Gyeongsang
Gyeongnam National University of Science and Technology – Jinju
Gyeongnam Provincial Geochang College - South Gyeongsang
Gyeongnam Provincial Namhae College - South Gyeongsang
Gyeongsang National University – Jinju, South Gyeongsang
Gimcheon University – Gimcheon, North Gyeongsang
Gumi University – Gumi, North Gyeongsang

H
Halla University – Wonju, Gangwon
Hallym College of Information and Industry – Chuncheon, Gangwon
Hallym University – Chuncheon, Gangwon
Hanbat National University – Daejeon
Handong Global University – Pohang, North Gyeongsang
Hanil University – Wanju County, North Jeolla and Jeonju, North Jeolla
Hankuk Aviation University – Goyang, Gyeonggi
Hankuk University of Foreign Studies – Seoul & Gyeonggi
Hankyong National University – Anseong, Gyeonggi
Hanlyo University – Gwangyang, South Jeolla
Hanmin University – Yeonsan
Hannam University – Daejon
Hansei University – Gunpo, Gyeonggi
Hanseo University – Seosan, South Chungcheong
Hanshin University – Osan, Gyeonggi
Hansung Technical College(서울예술직업전문학교) – Seoul
Hansung University – Seoul
Hanyang University – Seoul
Hanyang Cyber University
Hanyang Women's University – Seoul
Hanyeong College – Yeosu, South Jeolla
Hanyoung Theological University – Seoul
Hanzhung University – Donghae, Ganwon
Hapdong Theological Seminary – Suwon, Gyeonggi
Honam Theological University and Seminary – Gwangju
Honam University – Gwangju
Hongik University – Seoul
Hongseong Polytechnic College – Hongseong County, South Chungcheong
Hoseo University – Asan, South Chungcheong
Howon University – Gunsan, North Jeolla
Hyechon College – Daejeon
Hyejeon College – Hongseong County, South Chungcheong
Hyupsung University – Hwaseong, Gyeonggi

I
Information and Communications University – Daejeon
Iksan National College – Iksan, North Jeolla
Incheon Catholic University – Incheon
Incheon National University – Incheon
Incheon Polytechnic College – Incheon
Incheon National University of Education – see Gyeongin National University of Education
Induk University – Seoul
Inha Technical College – Incheon
Inha University – Incheon
Inje University – Gimhae, South Gyeongsang
International Graduate School of English – Seoul
International University of Korea

J
See also under C

Jangan University – Hwaseong, Gyeonggi
JEI University – Incheon
Jecheon Polytechnic College – Jecheon, North Chungcheong
Jeju College of Technology – Jeju City, Jeju (unification with Tamna University, now Jeju International University)
Jeju International University – Jeju City, Jeju
Jeju National University – Jeju City, Jeju
Jeonbuk Polytechnic College – Gimje, North Jeolla
Jeonju Kijeon Women's College – Jeonju, North Jeolla
Jeonju National University of Education – Jeonju, North Jeolla
Jeonju Technical College – Jeonju, North Jeolla
Jeonju University – Jeonju, North Jeolla
Jeonnam Provincial College – Damyang County and Jangheung County, South Jeolla
Jinju College – Jinju, South Gyeongsang
Jinju Health College – Jinju, South Gyeongsang
Jinju National University – Jinju, South Gyeongsang
Jisan College – see Catholic University of Pusan
Joong-ang Sangha University – Gimpo, Gyeonggi
Joongbu University – Geumsan County, South Chungcheong
Jungseok Institute of Technology – Seoul
Juseong College – Cheongwon County, North Chungcheong

K
See also under G
KAIST – Daejeon, abbreviated term of Korea Advanced Institute of Science and Technology
Kangnam University – Yongin, Gyeonggi
Kangwon National University – Chuncheon and Samcheok, Gangwon
Kangwon Tourism College – Taebaek, Gangwon
Kaya University – Goryeong, North Gyeongsang and Gimhae, South Gyeongsang
Kaywon School of Art and Design (계원예술대학교)– Uiwang, Gyeonggi
KDI School of Public Policy and Management – Seoul
Keimyung College – Daegu
Keimyung University – Daegu
Keukdong College – Eumseong County, North Chungcheong
Kimcheon Science College – Gimcheon, North Gyeongsang
Kimpo College – Gimpo, Gyeonggi
Kkottongnae Hyundo University of Social Welfare – Cheongwon County, North Chungcheong
Koguryeo College
Koje College – Geoje, South Gyeonsang
Kongju Communication Arts College(공주영상정보대학) – Gongju, South Chungcheong
Kongju National University – Gongju, South Chungcheong
Konkuk University – Seoul and Chungju City, North Chungcheong
Konyang University – Nonsan, South Chungcheong and Daejeon
Kookmin University – Seoul
Korea Aerospace University – Goyang, Gyeonggi
Korea Air Force Academy – Cheongwon County, North Chungcheong
Korea Baptist Theological University – Daejeon
Korea Christian University(그리스도대학교) – Seoul
Korea Cyber University – Seoul
Korea Digital University – Seoul
Korea Maritime University – Busan
Korea Military Academy – Seoul
Korea National College of Rehabilitation and Welfare – Pyeongtaek, Gyeonggi
Korea National Defense University – Seoul
Korea National Open University – Seoul
Korea National Police University – Yongin, Gyeonggi
Korea National University of Arts – Seoul
Korea National University of Education – Cheongwon County, North Chungcheong
Korea National University of Transportation - Chungju City, North Chungcheong
Korea National Railroad College – Uiwang, Gyeonggi
Korea National Sport University – Seoul
Korea Nazarene University – Cheonan, South Chungcheong
Korea Polytechnics
Korea Polytechnic I – Seoul and Seongnam, Gyeonggi
Korea Polytechnic II – Anseong, Incheon, Hwaseong, Gyeonggi
Korea Polytechnic III – Chuncheon, Wonju and Gangneung
Korea Polytechnic IV – Daejeon, Cheongju, Chungju, Asan and Hongseong
Korea Polytechnic V – Gwangju, Gimje, Mokpo, Iksan and Suncheon
Korea Polytechnic VI – Daegu, Gumi, Pohang and Yeongju
Korea Polytechnic VII – Busan, Ulsan, Changwon and Jinju
Korea Aviation Polytechnic – Sacheon, South Gyeongsang
Korea Bio Polytechnic – Nonsan, South Chungcheong
Korea Textile and Fashion Polytechnic – Daegu
Korea Women's Polytechnic – Gyeonggi
Korea Polytechnic University
Korea Tourism College – Icheon, Gyeonggi
Korea University – Seoul
Korea University of Science and Technology – Seoul, Suwon, Changwon, Ansan, Seongnam, and Daejeon
Korea University of Technology and Education – Cheonan, South Chungcheong
Korean National University of Cultural Heritage – Buyeo County, South Chungcheong
Korean Bible University – Seoul
Kosin University – Busan
Kukje Theological University and Seminary – Seoul
Kumoh National Institute of Technology – Gumi, North Gyeongsang
Kunjang College – Gunsan, North Jeolla
Kunsan College of Nursing – Gunsan, North Jeolla
Kunsan National University – Gunsan, North Jeolla
Kwandong University – Gangneung, Gangwon
Kwangju Institute of Science and Technology – Gwangju
Kwangju Polytechnic College – Gwangju
Kwangju Women's University – Gwangju
Kwangshin University – Gwangju
Kwangwoon University – Seoul
Kwangyang Health College – Gwangyang, South Jeolla
Kyeyak Graduate School of Theology – Gwangju, Gyeonggi
Kyongbuk College of Science – Chilgok County, North Gyeongsang
Kyonggi Institute of Technology – Siheung, Gyeonggi
Kyonggi University – Seoul and Suwon City, Gyeonggi
Kyongju University – see Gyeongju University
Kyungbok University – Pocheon, Gyeonggi
Kyungbuk College – Yeongju, North Gyeongsang
Kyungbuk Foreign Language Techno College – Gyeongsan, North Gyeongsang
Kyungdong College of Techno-Information – Gyeongsan, North Gyeongsang
Kyungdong University – Goseong, Gangwon
Kyunghee University – Seoul
Kyung Hee Cyber University – Seoul
Kyungil University – Gyeongsan City, North Gyeongsang
Kyungin Women's College – Incheon
Kyungmin College – Uijeongbu, Gyeonggi
Kyungmoon College – Pyeongtaek, Gyeonggi
Kyungnam College of Information and Technology – Busan
Kyungnam University – Changwon, South Gyeongsang
Kyungpook National University – Daegu
Kyungsung University – Busan
Kyungwon College – Seongnam, Gyeonggi
Kyungwoon University – Gumi, North Gyeongsang

L
Luther University – Yongin, Gyeonggi

M
Masan University – Masan, South Gyeongsang
Methodist Theological University(감리교신학대학교) – Seoul
Miryang National University – Miryang, South Gyeongsang
Mokpo Catholic University – Mokpo, South Jeolla
Mokpo National Maritime University – Mokpo, South Jeolla
Mokpo National University – Mokpo, South Jeolla
Mokpo Polytechnic College – Mokpo, South Jeolla
Mokpo Science University – Mokpo, South Jeolla
Mokwon University – Daejeon
Mun Kyung College – Mungyeong, North Gyeongsang
Myongji University – Seoul
Myungshin University – Suncheon, South Jeolla

N
Naju College – Naju, South Jeolla
Nambu University – Gwangju
Namseoul University – Cheonan, South Chungcheong
National Medical Center College of Nursing(국립의료원 간호대학) – Seoul

O
Open Cyber University – Seoul
Osan University – Osan, Gyeonggi

P
See also under B

Paekche Institute of the Arts – Wanju County, North Jeolla
Pai Chai University – Daejeon
Pohang College – Pohang, North Gyeongsang
Pohang University of Science and Technology (POSTECH) – Pohang, North Gyeongsang
Presbyterian College and Theological Seminary(장로회신학대학교) – Seoul
Pukyong National University – Busan
Pusan Arts College – Busan 
Pusan National University – Busan
Pusan University of Foreign Studies – Busan
Pusan Women's College – Busan
Pyeongtaek University – Pyeongtaek, Gyeonggi

R
Red Cross College of Nursing(적십자간호대학) – Seoul

S
Saekyung College – Yeongwol County, Gangwon
Sahmyook University – Seoul
Samcheok National University – Samcheok, Gangwon (unification with Kangwon National University, now KNU Samcheok Campus)
Sangji University – Wonju, Gangwon
Sangju National University – Sangju, North Gyeongsang
Sangmyung University – Seoul and Cheonan City, South Chungcheong
Sejong University – Seoul
Semin Digital University – Daegu
Semyung University – Jecheon, North Chungcheong
Seoil University – Seoul
Seojeong University - Yangju, Gyeonggi
Seoyeong University – Gwangju
Seokyeong University – Seoul
Seongnam Polytechnic College – Seongnam, Gyeonggi
Seoul Bible Graduate School of Theology – Seoul
Seoul Christian University – Seoul
Seoul Cyber University – Seoul
Seoul Digital University – Seoul
Seoul Health College – Seongnam, Gyeonggi
Seoul Institute of the Arts – Ansan, Gyeonggi
Seoul IT Polytechnic College – Seoul
Seoul Jangsin University – Seoul and Gwangju City, Gyeonggi
Seoul-Jeongsu Polytechnic College – Seoul
Seoul National University – Seoul
Seoul National University of Education – Seoul
Seoul National University of Science and Technology – Seoul
Seoul Sports Graduate University – Seoul
Seoul Theological University – Bucheon, Gyeonggi
Seoul Women's College of Nursing – Seoul
Seoul Women's University – Seoul
Seowon University – Cheongju, North Chungcheong
Shin Ansan University – Ansan, Gyeonggi
Shingu College – Seongnam, Gyeonggi
Shinheung College – Uijeongbu, Gyeonggi
Shinsung University – Dangjin County, South Chungcheong
Silla University – Busan
Sogang University – Seoul
Sohae College – Gunsan, North Jeolla
Songho College – Hoengseong County, Gangwon
Songwon University – Gwangju
Sookmyung Women's University – Seoul
Soonchunhyang University – Asan, South Chungcheong
Soong Eui Women's College – Seoul
Soongsil University – Seoul
Sorabol College – Gyeongju, North Gyeongsang
State University of New York Korea – Yeonsu, Incheon 
Suncheon Cheongam College – Suncheon, South Jeolla
Suncheon First College – Suncheon, South Jeolla
Sunchon National University – Suncheon, South Jeolla
Sung-duk College – Yeongcheon, North Gyeongsang
Sungsan Hyodo Graduate School – Incheon
Sunghwa College – Gangjin County, South Jeolla
Sungkonghoe University – Seoul
Sungkyul University – Anyang, Gyeonggi
Sungkyunkwan University – Seoul and Suwon City, Gyeonggi
Sungmin University – Cheonan and Seoul
Sungshin Women's University – Seoul
Sunlin University – Pohang, North Gyeongsang
Sunmoon University – Asan and Cheonan, South Chungcheong
Suwon Catholic University – Hwaseong, Gyeonggi
Suwon Science College – Hwaseong, Gyeonggi
Suwon Women's College – Suwon

T
See also under D

Taegu Science College – Daegu
Taekyeung University – Gyeongsan, North Gyeongsang
Taeshin Christian University(대신대학교) – Gyeongsan, North Gyeongsang
Tamna University – Seogwipo, Jeju (unification with Jeju College of Technology, now Jeju International University)
Tongmyong University – Busan
Tongwon University – Gwangju, Gyeonggi
Torch Trinity Graduate University – Seoul
Transnational Law and Business University – Goyang, Gyeonggi

U
Uiduk University – Gyeongju, North Gyeongsang
Ulsan College – Ulsan
Ulsan National Institute of Science and Technology – Ulsan
University of Incheon – Incheon
University of Seoul – Seoul
University of Science & Technology - Daejeon and Seoul
University of Suwon – Suwon
University of Ulsan – Ulsan
University of Utah Asia Campus – Songdo, Incheon

W
Westminster Graduate School of Theology(웨스트민스터신학대학원대학교) – Seoul
Won Buddhism Graduate School(원불교대학원대학교) – Iksan, North Jeolla
Wonju National College – Wonju, Gangwon
Wonkwang Health Science College(원광보건대학교) – Iksan, North Jeolla
Wonkwang University – Iksan, North Jeolla
Woongji Accounting & Tax College(웅지세무대학교) – Paju, Gyeonggi
Woosong Information College(우송정보대학) – Daejeon
Woosong Technical College – Daejeon
Woosong University – Daejeon
Woosuk University – Wanju County, North Jeolla

Y
Yaeil Seminary – Hwaseong, Gyeonggi
Yangsan College – Yangsan, South Gyeongsang
Yeojoo Institute of Technology – Yeoju County, Gyeonggi
Yeungjin College – Daegu
Yeungnam College of Science and Technology – Daegu
Yeungnam University – Gyeongsan, North Gyeongsang
Yeonsung University – Anyang, Gyeonggi
Yewon Arts University – Imsil County, North Jeolla
Yonam Institute of Digital Technology – Jinju, South Gyeongsang
Yong-in Songdam College – Yongin, Gyeonggi
Yong-In University – Yongin, Gyeonggi
Yonsei University – Seoul and Wonju City, Gangwon
Yosu National University – Yeosu, South Jeolla
Youngdong University – Yeongdong County, North Chungcheong
Youngnam Theological College and Seminary – Gyeongsan, North Gyeongsang
Youngsan University – Yangsan, South Gyeongsang
Youngsan Won Buddhist University – Yeonggwang County, South Jeolla
Yuhan College – Bucheon, Gyeonggi

See also
List of research universities in the South Korea
Lists of universities and colleges
List of universities and colleges in Seoul
List of universities in North Korea
Tertiary education

References

External links 
 List of institutions from the South Korean Ministry of Education
 Ranking Web of Korean Universities

 
Korea, South

Korea, South